Xylylene dibromide is an organic compound with the formula C6H4(CH2Br)2.  It is an off-white solid that, like other benzyl halides, a strong lachrymator.  It is a useful reagent owing to the convenient reactivity of the two C-Br bonds. Two other isomers are known, para- and meta-xylylene dibromide.

Synthesis 
It is prepared by the photochemical reaction of ortho-xylene with bromine:

C6H4(CH3)2  +  2Br2  →  C6H4(CH2Br)2  +  2 HBr

Reactions
Further bromination gives the tetrabromide:
C6H4(CH2Br)2  +  2Br2  →  C6H4(CHBr2)2  +  2 HBr

Upon reaction with thiourea followed by hydrolysis of the intermediate bisisothiouronium salts, xylylene dibromide can be converted to the dithiol C6H4(CH2SH)2.

Xylylene dibromide is a precursor to the ephemeral molecule ortho-quinonedimethane, also known as xylylene.  This species can be trapped when the dehalogenation is conducted in the presence of iron carbonyl.

Coupling of xylylene dibromide by treatment with lithium metal gives dibenzocyclooctane, precursor to dibenzocyclooctadiene.

Related compounds
Xylylene dichloride, the dichloro analogue of the title compound.
Benzyl bromide, the simplest benzylic bromide.

References 

Organobromides
Benzyl compounds
Lachrymatory agents